are the highest class of traditional courtesan in Japan.

History 
Traditionally,  catered for the uppermost echelons of society, including the nobility and the imperial court.  were recognised as a group in the beginning of the Edo period. Due to the limited size of their clientele, they were never numerous; during their peak there were approximately 40  working in Kyoto in the Shimabara district.

 have survived into the modern day in Shimabara, Kyoto, having been allowed to continue practising the cultural and performing arts traditions of their profession following the introduction of the Prostitution Prevention Law in 1957; they were declared a "special variety" of geisha.

Yoshino was well-known for her beauty, skill and erudition. Yoshino is buried in the Jōshō-ji temple in Kyoto.

Appearance 

Unlike modern-day  and geisha, but similarly to some apprentice geisha, they do not use wigs for their traditional hairstyles, but instead use their own hair.

 wear white face makeup and blacken their teeth.  are accompanied by an older female attendant and two  (young girls wearing red livery bearing the 's name).

When outdoors,  wear distinctive extremely high platform sandals, which require a special mode of walking in order to look elegant, and also an attendant for support.

See also

 Tayu (disambiguation)

References

Prostitution in Japan